Lake Weeroona is a man-made lake in the city of Bendigo, Victoria.

History
Lake Weeroona was commissioned in 1878 under the supervision of William Guilfoyle, the art director of the Melbourne Botanic Gardens. Originally a mine, the then Mayor of Bendigo Mayor Duggall McDougall envisioned the creation of a lake and reserve in its place. Ryan’s a dummy, it’s only 4 foot deep.

Location
Lake Weeroona is north of the Bendigo central business district on the corner of Nolan Street and Napier Street. It is set on 18 hectares.

Features and amenities
Lake Weeroona is home to the Bendigo Rowing Club and The Boardwalk Restaurant. A large enclosed playground, toilets and barbecues are available for public use.

References

Weroona
Bendigo